Sheikh Mahmoud Khalil Abd al-Rahman al-Qari was the Imam of the mosque of the two Qiblas in Medina and the formerly appointed Imam of the Prophet’s Mosque. He is the son of Khalil Al-Qari.

Mahmoud Khalil Al-Qari was born and raised in Medina. He memorized the Qur’an from his father Khalil Al-Qari, when he was ten years old. He also obtained a bachelor’s degree in the College of the Holy Qur’an and Islamic Studies.

The approval was issued to assign him as Imam in the Prophet’s Mosque in Tarawih prayers during the month of Ramadan in the year 1438 and 1439 AH (2017 and 2018). He continued to lead the worshipers at the Al-Qiblatain Mosque until his death.

Death 
He died on the morning of Saturday 26 Dhu al-Qa’dah 1443 AH corresponding to 25 June 2022 in Medina, in intensive care unit in a hospital after illness. His funeral prayer was offered on the same day after the Maghrib prayer in the Prophet’s Mosque and burial in Al-Baqi Cemetery.

References

20th-century births
2022 deaths
Burials at Jannat al-Baqī
Saudi Arabian Sunni Muslim scholars of Islam
Saudi Arabian people of Pakistani descent
People from Medina
Saudi Arabian imams
Saudi Arabian Quran reciters